Wat Saravan, officially Wat Saravan Techo (UNGEGN: , ALA-LC:), is a wat in Phnom Penh, Cambodia. It is located to the northwest of the Royal Palace of Cambodia and southwest of Wat Ounalom. It is said to have over 3,400 manuscripts in what has been described as the largest library in the country.

References 

Buddhist temples in Phnom Penh